Symplocos calycodactylos is a species of plant in the family Symplocaceae. It is endemic to Peninsular Malaysia. It is threatened by habitat loss.

References

calycodactylos
Endemic flora of Peninsular Malaysia
Vulnerable plants
Taxonomy articles created by Polbot